Nerekhta is the name of several inhabited localities in Russia.

Urban localities
Nerekhta, Kostroma Oblast, a town in Kostroma Oblast; 

Rural localities
Nerekhta, Vladimir Oblast, a settlement in Kovrovsky District of Vladimir Oblast